is a private university in Aoba-ku, Yokohama, Kanagawa prefecture, Japan.

Toin University of Yokohama was established in 1988. It offers degree programs in sports medicine, medical technology, engineering and law.

External links
 Official website 

Educational institutions established in 1988
Private universities and colleges in Japan
Toin University of Yokohama
1988 establishments in Japan